Charter Party may refer to:
 Charter party, a type of maritime contract
 Charter Party (horse), a racehorse
 Charter Committee, an independent political organization in Cincinnati, Ohio
 Pirate code